The 1988 Chattanooga Moccasins football team represented the University of Tennessee at Chattanooga as a member of the Southern Conference (SoCon) in the 1988 NCAA Division I-AA football season. The Moccasins  were led by fifth-year head coach Buddy Nix and played their home games at Chamberlain Field. They finished the season 4–7, overall and 3–3 in SoCon play to place third.

Schedule

References

Chattanooga
Chattanooga Mocs football seasons
Chattanooga Moccasins football